The Manassas Park Police Department (MPPD) is the primary law enforcement agency servicing 14,273 people within  of jurisdiction within Manassas Park, Virginia.

Organization
The Chief of Police is Chief John Evans. The MPPD currently has 50+ employees and officers. The MPPD has been accredited by the Virginia Law Enforcement Professional Standards Commission (VLEPSC).

Specialized Services Division:
Traffic Enforcement Unit - Enforces traffic codes and is responsible for accident investigation and crash reconstruction.
Investigation Services Division - Investigates major crimes which occur within the city, such as Homicides, Burglaries, Robberies, Sexual Assaults and White Collar Crimes.
K-9 Teams - Perform preventative patrol, including inspection activity, oriented toward prevention of crimes, maintenance of public order and responds to calls for services, traffic direction, and control.
Regional Narcotic Task Force - A multi-jurisdictional narcotics investigative unit serving the City of Manassas Park, City of Manassas, and Prince William County.

Community Services Division:
Community Resource Officer - Specifically trained officers who act as a liaison between the community and the police department in all matters dealing with crime prevention.
Neighborhood Watch - Brings citizens together to make their neighborhood a safer place to live.
School Resource Officer - Respond to problems which are criminal in nature and are involved in the classroom by sharing their particular field of knowledge on anything from career presentations to government and civic classes.
Business Watch - Works in the same way as Neighborhood Watch, except that it is tailored to meet the needs of the business community.
Vacation Home Check - Officers will periodically check the exterior of your home while you are away.
Security Surveys - Inspection of residential or commercial property at no cost to the property owner.
Safer by Design - Recognizes that neighborhood environments can either encourage or discourage criminal activity.
Police Station Tours - Includes an explanation of various sections and services offered by the Manassas Park Police Department.

See also 

 List of law enforcement agencies in Virginia

References

External links
Manassas Park Police Department official weblink
Manassas Park government official website

Municipal police departments of Virginia
Police Department